Polli Sree College is an intermediate college in Bangladesh. It is located in the village of Madertala in Dumuria Upazila under Khulna District. It was established in 1994.  It originated from a Polli Sree School.

References

External links
 

Colleges in Khulna District
Khulna District